Gymnopyge is a genus of May beetles and junebugs in the family Scarabaeidae. There are at least four described species in Gymnopyge.

Species
These four species belong to the genus Gymnopyge:
 Gymnopyge coquilletti Linell, 1896
 Gymnopyge hirsuta Cazier, 1939
 Gymnopyge hopliaeformis Linell, 1896
 Gymnopyge pygmaea Linell, 1896

References

Further reading

 
 
 
 
 

Melolonthinae
Articles created by Qbugbot